Moola or Moolah may refer to:

People
Moola Venkata Rangaiah, Indian film producer
Moola Narayana Swamy (born 1950), Indian film producer and entrepreneur
The Fabulous Moolah (1923–2007), ring name of professional wrestler Lillian Ellison
Young Money, also known as Young Moolah by label rapper Lil Wayne

Places
Moola, Queensland, a town in Australia

Arts, entertainment, and media
Moola (2007), a film directed by Don Most, starring William Mapother
 "Moola, Moola", a No. 1 single in Canada by Jordy Birch
 Moolah (song), a song by Young Greatness

Other uses
 Moola or moolah, a slang term for money
Operation Moolah, a US Air Force operation during the Korean War

See also
 Mula (disambiguation)
 Mullah, a Muslim educated in Islamic theology and sacred law